Lisa Patton is an American author. Born and raised in Memphis, Tennessee, Patton attended an all-girls college preparatory school, the Hutchison School, from kindergarten through twelfth grade. She received a Bachelor of Arts degree in Communications from the University of Alabama in 1980, where she was a member of the Zeta Chapter of Kappa Delta.

In her first novel, Whistlin' Dixie in a Nor'Easter, Leelee Satterfield moves with her husband Baker from her home in Memphis to Vermont, where they buy and run an inn. Leelee adjusts to life in the North and learns to be more independent.

Her second novel, Yankee Doodle Dixie, follows Leelee back to Memphis, where she meets a rock star and follows him to New York City.

Her third novel, Southern as a Second Language is the final in what Library Journal calls "the beloved Dixie Series."

Her fourth novel, Rush, is set on the Ole Miss campus.

In addition to writing, Patton is an event speaker.

Bibliography
 Whistlin' Dixie in a Nor'Easter, St. Martin’s Press, 2009
 Yankee Doodle Dixie, St. Martin’s Press, 2011
 Southern as a Second Language, St. Martin's Press, 2013
 RUSH, St. Martin's Press, 2018

References

External links

Year of birth missing (living people)
Living people
Writers from Memphis, Tennessee
21st-century American novelists
American women novelists
Novelists from Tennessee
21st-century American women writers